Pedro Amorim Duarte (13 October 1919 – 25 September 1989) was a Brazilian footballer. He played in six matches for the Brazil national football team from 1940 to 1942. He was also part of Brazil's squad for the 1942 South American Championship.

References

External links
 

1919 births
1989 deaths
Brazilian footballers
Brazil international footballers
Place of birth missing
Association football forwards
Fluminense FC players
Esporte Clube Bahia players